Barnstable Bay may be:
An alternative name of Bideford Bay, Devon, England (Barnstaple Bay)
A Colonial-era name of Cape Cod Bay, Massachusetts (Barnstable Bay)